The following is the 1979–80 network television schedule for the three major English language commercial broadcast networks in the United States. The schedule covers primetime hours from September 1979 through August 1980. The schedule is followed by a list per network of returning series, new series, and series cancelled after the 1978–79 season. All times are Eastern and Pacific, with certain exceptions, such as Monday Night Football.

New fall series are highlighted in bold.

Each of the 30 highest-rated shows is listed with its rank and rating as determined by Nielsen Media Research.

 Yellow indicates the programs in the top 10 for the season.
 Cyan indicates the programs in the top 20 for the season.
 Magenta indicates the programs in the top 30 for the season.

PBS, the Public Broadcasting Service, was in operation but the schedule was set by each local station.

Sunday 

(*) Formerly known as All in the Family.

Monday

Tuesday

Wednesday

Thursday 

(*) Formerly known as Mrs. Columbo

 Friday 

 Saturday 

Note: In November 1979, CBS took Paris off their Saturday night lineup before scheduling it in the 10:00-11:00 pm time slot on Tuesdays beginning December 4.

By network

ABC

Returning Series20/20The ABC Sunday Night MovieABC NFL Monday Night FootballAngieBarney MillerCharlie's AngelsEight Is EnoughFamilyFantasy IslandHappy DaysLaverne & ShirleyThe Love BoatMonday Night BaseballMork & MindyThe RopersSalvage 1SoapTaxiThree's CompanyVega$New Series240-RobertThe AssociatesB.A.D. Cats *BensonDetective SchoolGalactica 1980 *Goodtime Girls *Hart to HartThe Lazarus SyndromeA New Kind of FamilyNobody's Perfect *One in a Million *Out of the Blue *Stone *Tenspeed and Brown Shoe *That's Incredible! *When the Whistle Blows *

Not returning from 1978–79:13 Queens BoulevardApple PieBattlestar GalacticaCarol Burnett & CompanyCarter CountryDelta HouseDoctors' Private LivesDonny & MarieFriendsThe Hardy Boys MysteriesHow the West Was WonLucanThe MacKenzies of Paradise CoveMakin' ItOperation PetticoatStarsky & HutchWelcome Back, KotterWhat's Happening!!CBS

Returning Series60 MinutesAliceThe Bad News BearsBarnaby JonesThe ChisholmsDallasThe Dukes of HazzardHawaii Five-OThe Incredible HulkThe JeffersonsLou GrantM*A*S*HOne Day at a TimeThe WaltonsThe White ShadowWKRP in CincinnatiNew SeriesArchie Bunker's Place Beyond Westworld *Big Shamus, Little ShamusCalifornia FeverThe Contender *Flo *Hagen *House Calls *Knots LandingThe Last ResortPalmerstown, U.S.A. *ParisPhyl & Mikhy *The Stockard Channing Show *Struck by LightningThat's My Line *The Tim Conway Show *Trapper John, M.D.Universe *Walter Cronkite's Universe *Working StiffsYoung MaverickNot returning from 1978–79:All in the FamilyThe Amazing Spider-ManThe American GirlsBillyDorothyFlatbushFlying HighGood TimesHanging InIn the BeginningJust FriendsKazMarried: The First YearMaryThe Mary Tyler Moore HourMiss Winslow and SonMoses the LawgiverThe New Adventures of Wonder WomanThe Paper ChaseRhodaTime ExpressNBC

Returning SeriesB.J. and the BearThe Big EventCHiPsDiff'rent StrokesDisney's Wonderful WorldHello, LarryKate Loves a MysteryLittle House on the PrairieNBC Monday Night at the MoviesQuincy, M.E.Real PeopleThe Rockford FilesNew SeriesThe Big Show *Buck Rogers in the 25th CenturyEischiedThe Facts of Life *From Here to Eternity *Good Time Harry *Here's Boomer *Joe's World *A Man Called SloaneMe and Maxx *The Misadventures of Sheriff LoboPink LadySanford *The Six O'Clock Follies *Skag *ShirleyUnited States *

Not returning from 1978–79:Brothers and SistersCliffhangersDavid Cassidy: Man UndercoverDick Clark's Live WednesdayThe Eddie Capra MysteriesGrandpa Goes to WashingtonHarris and CompanyHighcliffe ManorHizzonnerJoe & ValerieLaugh-InLifelinePresenting Susan AntonProject U.F.O.The RunawaysSupertrain$weepstake$Sword of JusticeTurnaboutW.E.B.The Waverly WondersWeekendWho's Watching the KidsWhodunnit?The Wonderful World of DisneyNote: The * indicates that the program was introduced in midseason.

References

Additional sources
 Castleman, H. & Podrazik, W. (1982). Watching TV: Four Decades of American Television. New York: McGraw-Hill. 314 pp.
 McNeil, Alex. Total Television. Fourth edition. New York: Penguin Books. .
 Brooks, Tim & Marsh, Earle (1985). The Complete Directory to Prime Time Network TV Shows'' (3rd ed.). New York: Ballantine. .

United States primetime network television schedules
1979 in American television
1980 in American television